Sui is a village in the Bhiwani district of the Indian state of Haryana. , the village had 930 households with a population of 5,063 of which 2,677 were male and 2,386 female.

References

Villages in Bhiwani district